Zhao Haifeng (Chinese: 赵海峰; 1919 – August 21, 2006) was a politician of the People's Republic of China. Zhadd was born in Raoyang, Hebei Province, and joined the Communist Party of China (CPC) in August 1938. Since July 1977, he had been serving as a standing committee member of the CPC Qinghai committee, vice secretary of that committee, vice director of the Qinghai revolutionary commission, secretary of the CPC Qinghai committee, chairman of the Qinghai CPPCC and first political commissar of the Qinghai Military Region.

1919 births
2006 deaths
People's Republic of China politicians from Hebei
Chinese Communist Party politicians from Hebei
Politicians from Hengshui
Political office-holders in Qinghai